Yuanlin is a railway station in Changhua County, Taiwan served by Taiwan Railways.

Overview 
The original station had one island platform and one side platform. The station underwent construction and converted into an elevated station in 2014.

Current platform diagram

Original platform diagram

History 
1905-03-26: The station opens for service.
1961-03-28: A new, concrete station opens for service.
2007-09-01: The Yuanlin Elevated Railway Project begins construction.
2008-03-11: The station becomes a stop on the Taroko Express.
2009-06-29: The elevated track of Yuanlin Elevated Railway Project begins construction.
2014-11-02: Current station opens.

Around the station
 Chung Chou University of Science and Technology
 Yuanlin Performance Hall
 Yuanlin City Office
 Yuanlin High School
 Yuanlin Agricultural and Industrial Vocational High School
 Yuanlin Transfer Station

See also
 List of railway stations in Taiwan

References

External links 

TRA Yuanlin Station 
TRA Yuanlin Station

1905 establishments in Taiwan
Railway stations in Changhua County
Railway stations opened in 1905
Railway stations served by Taiwan Railways Administration